Amîr Lemti (born 26 October 2000) is a Belgian professional footballer who plays for Heist in the Belgian First National Division. 

Lemti made his professional debut for OH Leuven on 28 February 2020 in the away match against Virton, a 4–1 loss.

References 

2000  births
Living people
Belgian footballers
Association football midfielders
Oud-Heverlee Leuven players
K.S.K. Heist players
Challenger Pro League players